Mykola Kuchmii is a Ukrainian Greco-Roman wrestler. He is a bronze medalist at the European Wrestling Championships.

Career 

He represented Ukraine at the 2015 European Games in Baku, Azerbaijan. He competed in the 130 kg event where he lost his first match against Sabah Shariati of Azerbaijan. He was then eliminated by Iakob Kajaia of Georgia in the first match of the repechage. In June 2019, he lost his bronze medal match in the 130 kg event at the European Games held in Minsk, Belarus but he was awarded this medal in November of that year after the disqualification of gold medalist Kiryl Hryshchanka of Belarus.

In 2020, he won one of the bronze medals in the 130 kg event at the European Wrestling Championships held in Rome, Italy. In that same year, he won one of the bronze medals in the 130 kg event at the 2020 Individual Wrestling World Cup held in Belgrade, Serbia.

In January 2021, he won the silver medal in the 130 kg event at the Grand Prix Zagreb Open held in Zagreb, Croatia. In March 2021, he competed at the European Qualification Tournament in Budapest, Hungary hoping to qualify for the 2020 Summer Olympics in Tokyo, Japan. He did not qualify at this tournament and he also failed to qualify for the Olympics at the World Olympic Qualification Tournament held in Sofia, Bulgaria.

Major results

References

External links 

 

Living people
Year of birth missing (living people)
Place of birth missing (living people)
Ukrainian male sport wrestlers
European Wrestling Championships medalists
Wrestlers at the 2015 European Games
Wrestlers at the 2019 European Games
European Games medalists in wrestling
European Games bronze medalists for Ukraine
21st-century Ukrainian people